Josep Maria Bayarri i Hurtado (Alboraya (Valencia), Spain, 1886-1970) was a writer and poet, also known as Xusep Maria Vaiarri.

He studied at the San Carlos School of Fine Arts before releasing his first publication, 1915's collection of Valencian poetry, Poetes valencians contemporanis, featuring various poets of his generation. He later helped found two poetry magazines in the Valencian language, El vers valencià (1934) and Ribalta (1939).

During several stages of his literary life he attempted to impose linguistic norms upon Valencian, based on the apitxat (Central Valencian) dialect instead of Standard Valencian. One such was the 1966 book, Alfavetisasió dels valensians. These attempts, however, met with little success.

His last work, published in the year of his death, was La qinteta epdomadaria (1970).

References
Antiblavers biography of Josep Maria Bayarri.
El perill català , a 1931 work by Josep Maria Bayarri (pdf).

1886 births
1970 deaths
People from Valencia
Writers from the Valencian Community
Catalan-language writers